The Rest of Our Life is the first collaborative album by American country music artists as well as husband and wife, Tim McGraw and Faith Hill. It was released on November 17, 2017, by Arista Nashville. While the album marks McGraw's fifteenth overall studio album and Hill's seventh, it is the first collaborative album between the couple. The album is also Hill's first studio recording of original material, not including her Christmas or compilation albums, in over twelve years.

The first single from the album, "Speak to a Girl" was released on March 23, 2017 and reached number 6 on the Billboard Hot Country Songs chart. The title track was released as the second single.

Promotion
Prior to the album's release, Hill and McGraw embarked upon the Soul2Soul World Tour, which included a set list composed of both artist's greatest hits and material from The Rest of Our Life. The tour continued into 2018 with the duo also headlining the C2C: Country to Country festival throughout the UK in March 2018.

Coinciding with the album's November 17 release date, an exhibit at the Country Music Hall of Fame and Museum in Nashville, titled Mississippi Woman, Louisiana Man, was opened to celebrate the careers of both Hill and McGraw.

Critical reception
Giving it three out of five stars, Stephen Thomas Erlewine of AllMusic wrote that "it's an album designed to be played on lazy Sunday afternoons, on long drives, and doing housework, a soundtrack to everyday life. As such, it can veer toward background music, but it's enlivened by the chemistry between McGraw and Hill."

Commercial performance
The Rest of Our Life debuted at No. 2 on the Billboard 200, and No. 1 on Top Country Albums, with 98,000 copies (104,000 album-equivalent units) sold in the first week. The album has sold 231,300 copies in the United States as of October 2018.

Track listing

Personnel 
Adapted from AllMusic

 Tim McGraw – lead vocals
 Faith Hill – lead vocals
 Byron Gallimore – keyboards, synthesizers
 Charlie Judge – keyboards
 Erik Lutkins – keyboards, synthesizers, loop programming
 Gordon Mote – acoustic piano
 Jamie Muhoberac – keyboards, synthesizers
 Steve Nathan – keyboards, synthesizers
 Jeff Roach – keyboards, synthesizers
 Mike Rojas – keyboards, synthesizers
 Vince Gill – acoustic guitar
 Danny Rader – acoustic guitar
 Bryan Sutton – acoustic guitar
 Ilya Toshinsky – acoustic guitar
 Dann Huff – electric guitar
 David Levita – electric guitar
 Troy Lancater – electric guitar
 Michael Landau – electric guitar
 Tom Morello – electric guitar
 Derek Wells – electric guitar
 Dan Dugmore – steel guitar
 Paul Franklin – steel guitar
 Justin Schipper – steel guitar
 Paul Bushnell – bass 
 Jimmie Lee Sloas – bass 
 Matt Chamberlain – drums
 Shannon Forrest – drums, percussion
 David Campbell – string arrangements and conductor
 David Stone – acoustic bass
 Michael Valerio – acoustic  bass
 Jacob Braun – cello
 Suzie Katayama – cello 
 Timothy Landauer – cello
 Steve Richards – cello
 Matt Funes – viola
 Luke Maurer – viola
 Darrin McCann – viola
 Gerardo Hilera – violin
 Songa Lee – violin
 Natalie Leggett – violin
 Mario DeLeón – violin
 Serena McKinney – violin
 Sara Parkins – violin
 Michele Richards – violin
 Tereza Stanislav – violin
 Josefina Vergara – violin
 Greg Barnhill – backing vocals
 Ben Caver – backing vocals
 Tania Hancheroff – backing vocals 
 Chris Rodriguez – backing vocals

Charts

Weekly charts

Year-end charts

References

2017 albums
Tim McGraw albums
Faith Hill albums
Arista Records albums
Vocal duet albums
Albums produced by Byron Gallimore
Albums produced by Tim McGraw